Tom Kessler is an American politician. He served as a Republican member for the 96th district of the Kansas House of Representatives.

In 2021, Kessler won the election for the 96th district of the Kansas House of Representatives. He succeeded Stephanie Yeager. Kessler assumed his office on January 11, 2021. He owned a liquor store.

References 

Living people
Place of birth missing (living people)
Year of birth missing (living people)
Republican Party members of the Kansas House of Representatives
21st-century American politicians